Robin McMaugh Klein (born 28 February 1936) is an Australian author of books for children. She was born in Kempsey, New South Wales, Australia, and now resides near Melbourne.

Early life
Robin Klein is one of nine children. She had her first short story published at the age of 16. She worked in number of jobs before becoming an established writer, including tea lady at a warehouse, bookshop assistant, nurse, copper enamelist, and program aide at a school for disadvantaged children.
In 1981, she was awarded a Literature Board grant for writing, and since then, she has had more than 20 books published. She is the poet of the poem "Amanda!". Robin Klein was educated at Newcastle Girls' High School.

Career
Several of her books have been short-listed for the Children's Book Council of Australia (CBCA) Children's Book of the Year Award, including Hating Alison Ashley (also a film starring Delta Goodrem) and Halfway Across the Galaxy and Turn Left (filmed as a television series for the Seven Network in 1992). Klein's novel Came Back to Show You I Could Fly won a human rights award for literature in 1989 and also won the 1990 CBCA Children's Book of the Year Award: Older Readers. It was filmed as Say a Little Prayer in 1993.

Several of her other books have received awards in Australia, including the South Australian Festival Award for Literature, which she won in 1998 with The Listmaker. Many others, including Boss of the Pool, have also won or been short-listed.
 
Robin Klein suffered an aneurysm rupture, and while she survived, since 2005, she has lived in a nursing home and is no longer able to write or do significant publicity work for her books.

Awards
 Special mention – Critici in Erba Prize at Bologna for The Giraffe in Pepperell Street (1978)
 Won – CBCA Children's Book of the Year Award: Younger Readers for Thing (1983)
 Won – Human Rights Literature and Awards (1989)
 Won – CBCA Children's Book of the Year Award: Older Readers for Came Back to Show You I Could Fly (1990)
 Won – Canberra's Own Outstanding List: Fiction for Older Readers Award for People Might Hear You (1991)
 Dromkeen Medal (1991)
 Won – Canberra's Own Outstanding List: Fiction for Older Readers Award for Came Back to Show You I Could Fly (1992)

Bibliography

Collections
 Ratbags and Rascals : Funny Stories (J.M. Dent, 1984), illustrated by Alison Lester
 Snakes and Ladders : poems about the ups and downs of life (J.M. Dent, 1985), illustrated by Ann James
 Tearaways (Viking, 1990, first published as Stories to Make You Think Twice)
 All in the Blue Unclouded Weather (Viking, c1991)

Penny Pollard books
illustrated by Ann James

 Penny Pollard's Diary (Oxford University Press, 1983)
 Penny Pollard's Letters (Oxford University Press, 1984)
 Penny Pollard in Print (Oxford University Press, 1986)
 Penny Pollard's Passport (Oxford University Press, 1988)
 Penny Pollard's Guide to Modern Manners (Oxford University Press, 1989)
 Penny Pollard's Scrapbook (Hodder Children's Books Australia, 1999)

Thing books
 Thing (Oxford University Press, 1982) illustrated by Alison Lester
 Thingnapped! (Oxford University Press, 1984)
 Thing Finds a Job (Hodder Headline, 1996), illustrated by Alison Lester
 Thing's Concert (Hodder Headline, 1996), illustrated by Alison Lester
 Thing's Birthday (Hodder Headline, 1996), illustrated by Alison Lester
 Thingitis (Hodder Headline, 1996), illustrated by Alison Lester

Miscellaneous
 The Giraffe in Pepperell Street (Hodder and Stoughton, 1978), illustrated by Gill Tomblin
 Junk Castle (Oxford University Press, 1983), illustrated by Rolf Heimann
 People Might Hear You (Puffin Books, 1983)
 Oodoolay  (Era Publications, c1983), illustrated by Vivienne Goodman
 Brock and the Dragon (Hodder & Stoughton, 1984), illustrated by Rodney McRae
 Hating Alison Ashley (Puffin Books, 1984)
 Thalia, the Failure (Ashton Scholastic, 1984), illustrated by Rhyll Plant
 The Enemies (Angus & Robertson, 1985), illustrated by Noela Young
 Halfway Across the Galaxy and Turn Left (Viking Kestrel, 1985)
 Serve Him Right! (Edward Arnold (Australia), 1985), illustrated by John Burge
 You're on Your Own! (Edward Arnold, 1985)
 Good For Something (Edward Arnold Australia, 1985)
 Separate Places (Roo Books, 1985), illustrated by Astra Lacis
 Games (Viking Kestrel, 1986), illustrated by Melissa Webb
 Boss of the Pool (Omnibus in association with Penguin, 1986)
 The Princess who Hated It (Omnibus Books, 1986), illustrated by Maire Smith
 Robin Klein's Crookbook (Methuen Australia, 1987), illustrated by Kristen Hilliard
 Don't Tell Lucy (Methuen Australia, 1987)
 Birk, the Berserker (Omnibus Books, 1987), illustrated by Alison Lester
 The Lonely Hearts Club (Oxford University Press, 1987), with Max Dann
 I Shot an Arrow (Viking Kestrel, 1987), illustrated by Geoff Hocking
 Christmas (Methuen, c1987), illustrated by Kristen Hilliard
 Laurie Loved Me Best (Viking Kestrel, 1988)
 Jane's Mansion  (Shortland, 1988), illustrated by Melissa Webb
 The Kidnapping of Clarissa Montgomery (Shortland, 1988), illustrated by Jane Wallace-Mitchell
 Against the Odds (Puffin Books, 1989), illustrated by Bill Wood
 Honoured Guest (Angus & Robertson, 1989)
 Came Back to Show You I Could Fly (Viking Penguin, 1989)
 The Ghost in Abigail Terrace (Omnibus Books, 1989), illustrated by Margaret Power
 Boris and Borsch (Allen & Unwin, 1990), illustrated by Cathy Wilcox
 Dresses of Red and Gold (Viking, 1992)
 Amy's Bed (Omnibus Books, 1992), illustrated by Coral Tulloch
 Seeing Things  (Penguin Books Australia, 1993)
 Turn Right for Zyrgon (Puffin, 1994)
 The Sky in Silver Lace (Penguin, 1995)
 The Listmaker (Viking, 1997)
 Barney's Blues (Puffin, 1998), illustrated by David Cox
 The Goddess (Lothian, 1998), illustrated by Anne Spudvilas
 Gabby's Fair (Omnibus Books, 1998), illustrated by Michael Johnson
 Anything Happens Tor Atar Gu (Abhishek Das Books)

Adaptations

Television
 Thing Penny Pollard's Diary Halfway Across the Galaxy and Turn Left, adapted by Michael Harvey and John Reeves (1991–1992)

Stage
 Hating Alison Ashley: The Play, adapted by Richard Tulloch
 Boss of the Pool, adapted by Mary Morris

Film
 Say a Little Prayer, based on Came Back to Show You I Could Fly, adapted and directed by Richard Lowenstein (1993)
 Hating Alison Ashley, adapted for the screen by Chris Anastassiades and Christine Madafferi (2005)

References

Further reading
 MS 9301- Papers of Robin Klein (1936 – ) National Library of Australia (Retrieved 11 August 2007)
 CYSS (NSW) Nancy Booker Honour Lecture 2000 by Margaret Hamilton (Retrieved 11 August 2007)
 Biography of Robin Klein (1936–) Answers.com
 1989 Human Rights Medal and Awards

External links
Penguin Books author profile
Fan site for the Halfway Across the Galaxy and Turn Left'' television series
Sophie Masson describes Klein's illness
 
 Say a Little Prayer (movie)

1936 births
20th-century Australian novelists
Australian children's writers
Australian women novelists
Living people
People from the Mid North Coast
Writers from New South Wales
Australian women children's writers
20th-century Australian women writers
Kempsey, New South Wales